Hartmut Boockmann (August 22, 1934 – June 15, 1998) was a German historian, specializing in medieval history.

Boockmann was born in Marienburg, East Prussia, Germany, after 1945 Malbork Poland. He received his Ph.D. in 1965. Boockmann was professor for medieval and modern history in Kiel from 1975 to 1982, then in Göttingen, between 1992 and 1995 at the Humboldt-University of Berlin, and thereafter until his death in Göttingen again. Boockmann was specialized in the German Late Middle Ages. He died in Göttingen.

Major publications
Laurentius Blumenau. Fürstlicher Rat – Jurist – Humanist (ca. 1415-1484), (=Göttinger Bausteine zur Geschichtswissenschaft ; Bd. 37), Göttingen 1965 (dissertation)
Johannes Falkenberg, der Deutsche Orden und die polnische Politik. Untersuchungen zur politischen Theorie des späteren Mittelalters. Mit einem Anhang: Die Satira des Johannes Falkenberg, Göttingen 1975 (Habilitation) 
Der Deutsche Orden. Zwölf Kapitel aus seiner Geschichte, zuerst München 1981 
Die Marienburg im 19. Jahrhundert, zuerst Frankfurt a. M. usw. 1982 
Die Stadt im späten Mittelalter, zuerst München 1986 
Stauferzeit und spätes Mittelalter. Deutschland 1125–1517, zuerst Berlin 1987 
Deutsche Geschichte im Osten Europas, Ostpreußen und Westpreußen, Berlin 1992 
Fürsten, Bürger, Edelleute, Lebensbilder aus dem späten Mittelalter, München 1994 
Wissen und Widerstand. Geschichte der deutschen Universität, Berlin 1999 
Wege ins Mittelalter. Historische Aufsätze, München 2000 
Einführung in die Geschichte des Mittelalters, 8. Auflage, München 2007  .

Literature
Peter Moraw: Nachruf Hartmut Boockmann. In: Deutsches Archiv für Erforschung des Mittelalters 54 (1998), S. 911–912.

External links

Texts of Boockmann in the web:
Spätmittelalterliche deutsche Stadt-Tyrannen
Bürgerkirchen im späteren Mittelalter - PDF
Lebensgefühl und Repräsentationsstil der Oberschicht in den deutschen Städten um 1500
Die Ritter und ihre Harnische

Biography
Nachruf von Werner Paravicini mit Auswahlbibliographie

German medievalists
University of Kiel alumni
Academic staff of the University of Göttingen
Academic staff of the Humboldt University of Berlin
1934 births
1998 deaths
People from Malbork
People from West Prussia
 People from East Prussia
20th-century German historians
German male non-fiction writers
Members of the Göttingen Academy of Sciences and Humanities